The Episcopal Church of the Good Shepard-Lakota was listed on the National Register of Historic Places in 2017.

It was bought in 2015 by Steve Martens, a retired architecture professor of North Dakota State University.

It was then renovated over a nine-month period and serves as a vacation home for two couples.

References

External links

National Register of Historic Places in Nelson County, North Dakota
Churches on the National Register of Historic Places in North Dakota
Episcopal church buildings in North Dakota